Bill Okyere Marshall  was a Ghanaian writer of plays and novels. He died June 2, 2021.

Biography 
Bill Okyere Marshall was born in 1933 into a wealthy family in Ghana. After attending Odogonor Secondary School, in the 1960s he attended the Guildhall School of Music and Drama in London to further his studies in playwriting and film.  This was followed by further studies in film and literature; He studied film at the Television Production School.

After an extended period in England, which included experience writing for the BBC and some time working, he went to Peterborough, New Hampshire. While he was there he wrote Song of Umbele. On his return to Ghana, he wrote a newspaper column under the nom de plume "Tuli Blanko." It was through this column that he became known to a wide readership.

He joined the Ghana Broadcasting Corporation-Television as a producer. From GBC-TV he joined Lintas Ghana for four years before establishing Studio Africain, of which he was the managing director. Between 1973 and 2003 Marshall produced four plays and two novels, wrote regularly for the press and worked in the Ghana Television drama department.

He was appointed Director of the National Film and Television Institute (NAFTI), a post he held for twelve years before retiring.

Bill Marshall was a fellow of the Ghana Association of Writers (GAW) and served as Deputy General Secretary, General Secretary and Vice President of the Association under the late Professor Atukwei Okai. He was a Fellow of the Pan African Writers Association (PAWA)

Over the decades, his writings were wide and diverse spanning film and television, radio, the press and books.

Plays and themes
In 1973,  Marshall produced his first play, The Son of Umbele, about a cursed fisherman. He also wrote a number of novels, including Bukom (1979) and Permit for Survival (1981), and published a collection of plays, The Crows and Other Plays. In 2003, he produced the play The Shadow of an Eagle, engaging mythology and symbolism to explore ideas of personal ambition and fulfillment. His most recent play Stranger to Innocence was also produced in 2003.

Works
 The Son of Umbele (play, 1973)
Child from the North (play, 1972, won the Hollywood festival of world television; best new comer's award)
 Bukom (novel, 1979 won the Ghana National Book Award for the young writer in 1979)
 Permit for Survival (novel, 1981)
 The Crows and Other Plays (collection of plays, 1998)
Oyster Man (play, 2000),
 Stranger to Innocence (play, 2003)
 Shadow of an Eagle (play, 2003)
Uncle Blanko’s Chair (2007)
Asana (a play in three acts, 2013)
Brother Man (novel)

References 

1936 births
Ghanaian writers
Living people